Kirill Novikov may refer to:

 Kirill Aleksandrovich Novikov (born 1981), Russian footballer
 Kirill Vasiliyevich Novikov (1905-1983), Soviet diplomat, List of Ambassadors of Russia to India
 Kirill Novikov (Estonian footballer), Estonian footballer (born 1989), 2010–11 Estonian Cup